Chong Ting-yan, known professionally as Elkie Chong, (born 2 November 1998) is a Hong Kong singer and actress currently based in mainland China. She was previously a child-actress under in Hong Kong’s TVB and has appeared on several television dramas. Under Cube Entertainment, she debuted as a member of the South Korean girl group CLC in February 2016. Following her request to terminate her contract with Cube in December 2020, Elkie left both Cube and CLC in February 2021.

Early life 
Chong was born on 2 November 1998 in Hong Kong. She attended Carmel Pak U Secondary School.

Career

2009–2015: Early career 
Chong was a popular teenage star in Hong Kong, being a former member of the Hong Kong project girl-group Honey Bees, and also a child-actress under TVB who acted in almost 20 dramas.

2016–2019: Debut with CLC and solo activities 

In February 2016, Chong was introduced as a new member of the South Korean girl-group CLC together with Kwon Eun-bin. She officially made her Korean debut on 29 February with the release of CLC's third EP, Refresh, and made her first public appearance with the group on the 463rd episode of Mnet's M Countdown performing "High Heels".

Chong was announced to make her K-drama debut in March 2018, in the weekend drama Rich Family's Son as Mong Mong, a Chinese foreign exchange student.

Chong made her solo debut with digital single "I Dream" on November 23, 2018.

In 2019, Chong was cast in a recurring role in Chinese drama A Little Thing Called First Love as Yang Man Ling, a senior who is responsible for a radio station.

2020–present: Request for contract termination 
In December 2020, Chong requested that her exclusive contract with Cube Entertainment be terminated on the grounds that the company violated the contract. She claimed that she had not been paid for her acting activities, and that Cube Entertainment had already stopped their "developmental support" of CLC.

On February 3, 2021, Cube Entertainment confirmed Chong's departure from CLC, and her contract with the company has been terminated. Chong currently resides and is pursuing a career in mainland China, although she maintains a good relationship with her former CLC members. In June 2021, Chong collaborated with T.U.B.S member  for the song "Gave My Heart Away".

Personal life 
On February 20, 2021, Chong expressed her support for the People's Liberation Army in the 2020 China–India skirmishes by quoting a photo of the official Chinese media "People's Daily" on Instagram to pay tribute to the mainland border guards.

Discography

Singles

Songwriting credits
All credits are adapted from the Korea Music Copyright Association, unless stated otherwise.

Filmography

Television series

References

External links

Living people
1998 births
Cube Entertainment artists
CLC (group) members
Hong Kong child actresses
Hong Kong expatriates in South Korea
K-pop singers
Korean-language singers of Hong Kong
TVB actors
21st-century Hong Kong women singers